"Where Do We Go from Here" is a song performed by American contemporary R&B singer Stacy Lattisaw, issued as the second single from her ninth studio album What You Need. The song features vocals from frequent collaborator Johnny Gill. Released in 1989, it peaked at #1 for two weeks on the Billboard R&B chart in 1990.

Chart positions

References

External links
 
 

1989 songs
1989 singles
Stacy Lattisaw songs
Johnny Gill songs
Motown singles
Songs written by LeMel Humes
1980s ballads
Contemporary R&B ballads